Gafencu is a Romanian surname that may refer to:

Eduard Gafencu (born 1993), Romanian kickboxer and boxer
Grigore Gafencu (1892–1957), Romanian politician, diplomat, and journalist
Liliana Gafencu (born 1975), Romanian rower
Valeriu Gafencu (1921–1952), Romanian Orthodox theologian and Legionnaire
Vasile Gafencu (1886–1942), Bessarabian politician

Romanian-language surnames